Maquanying Station is a station on Line 15 of the Beijing Subway.

Station layout 
The station has underground dual-island platforms.

Exits 
There are 3 exits, lettered A, B, and C. Exit C is accessible.

References

External links 

Beijing Subway stations in Chaoyang District